Adriana Millard Pacheco (born 13 May 1926) is a Chilean sprinter. She competed in the women's 200 metres at the 1952 Summer Olympics.

Notes

References

External links
 

1926 births
Living people
Athletes (track and field) at the 1948 Summer Olympics
Athletes (track and field) at the 1952 Summer Olympics
Chilean female sprinters
Chilean female long jumpers
Olympic athletes of Chile
Pan American Games medalists in athletics (track and field)
Pan American Games silver medalists for Chile
Pan American Games bronze medalists for Chile
Athletes (track and field) at the 1951 Pan American Games
Medalists at the 1951 Pan American Games
20th-century Chilean women